Serhiy Kovalyov (21 November 1971 in Donetsk Oblast, Ukrainian SSR) was a Ukrainian professional footballer and currently is football manager.

His first trainer was P. Ponomarenko.

Due to medical condition, Kovalyov was forced to retire from playing.

Career statistics

International goals

Honours
 Ukrainian Premier League runner-up: 1997, 1998, 1999, 2000.
 Ukrainian Cup winner: 1995, 1997, 2001.

References

External links
 

1971 births
Living people
Ukrainian footballers
Ukraine international footballers
Ukrainian Premier League players
FC Shakhtar Donetsk players
FC Dynamo-2 Kyiv players
Ukrainian football managers
FC Shakhtar-3 Donetsk managers
Association football midfielders
Sportspeople from Donetsk Oblast